"Después de la Playa" (English: "After the Beach") is a song by Puerto Rican rapper Bad Bunny that appears as the second track on his fifth studio album Un Verano Sin Ti (2022), which was released on May 6, 2022, by Rimas Entertainment. The song was written by Benito Martínez and its production was handled by MAG, La Paciencia, Elikai and Dahian el Apechao. On June 15, 2022, the song was sent to radio as the fourth official single off the album.

Commercial performance
Following the release of Un Verano Sin Ti, "Después de la Playa" charted at number 6 on the US Billboard Hot 100 dated May 21, 2022, becoming the third-highest charting track from the album behind "Moscow Mule" and "Tití Me Preguntó", which peaked at number 4 and 5, respectively; it was one of four American top-ten hits from the album. The song also charted at numbers 3 and 7 on the US Hot Latin Songs and Billboard Global 200, respectively.

Audio visualizer
A 360° audio visualizer for the song was uploaded to YouTube on May 6, 2022, along with the other audio visualizer videos of the songs that appeared on Un Verano Sin Ti.

Charts

Weekly charts

Year-end charts

Certifications

See also 
List of Billboard Hot 100 top-ten singles in 2022

References

External links
 

2022 songs
Bad Bunny songs
Songs written by Bad Bunny